The Colony of Unrequited Dreams is a novel by Wayne Johnston, published on September 30, 1998 by Knopf Canada. Johnston's breakthrough work, the novel was a Canadian bestseller, and was shortlisted for the 1998 Giller Prize and the 1998 Governor General's Award for English fiction.

In 2003, Justin Trudeau championed the book on CBC Radio's Canada Reads.

A work of historical fiction, the novel presents a fictionalized portrayal of real-life Newfoundland politician Joey Smallwood, the political leader who brought the province into Canadian Confederation in 1949. A major literary device in the novel is the intertwining of his life, since childhood, with (fictional) journalist Sheilagh Fielding.

A stage adaptation by Robert Chafe premiered in February 2015. It was nominated for the Governor General's Literary Award in 2017.

Title 
Johnston says the title of the book evokes

References 

1998 Canadian novels
Novels by Wayne Johnston
Novels set in Newfoundland and Labrador
Novels about politicians
Knopf Canada books